Springfield Television Corporation was a group owner of television stations based in Springfield, Massachusetts. The company was founded by William Lowell Putnam III, who launched the company's first television station, WWLP, on March 17, 1953. (Putnam was the son of politician and businessman, Roger Putnam. He was also a former trustee of the Lowell Observatory, founded by his great-uncle, astronomer Percival Lowell.)

The company owned five television stations during its lifetime, no more than four at any given time.

The company folded in 1984 with Putnam's retirement, and the sale of its remaining stations—WWLP, WKEF in Dayton, Ohio, and KSTU in Salt Lake City, Utah—to Adams Communications.

Former stations

References

 

Defunct television broadcasting companies of the United States
Defunct companies based in Massachusetts
Mass media companies established in 1953
Mass media companies disestablished in 1984